Here is the list of all the collaborations from Puerto Rican Reggaeton singer Don Omar with other singers in other albums. This list doesn't include the single charts.

Year

1996 
  Génesis | Osito & Omar - Juan 3:16

1999 
 The Cream 4: El Día del Juicio | MC Yaga & Don Omar - Instinto Criminal

1999 
 Major League - Tiempo (ft. Yanuri)
 Major League - I'm the message (ft. Yanuri)
 Major League - Azotalos (ft. Yanuri)

2001 
 Buddha's Family - Bailen (ft. Yanuri)
 Las Plagas 2 - A Ritmo Piden Que Cante (ft. Yanuri)

2002 
 The Godfather - Déjala
 A la Reconquista - Sientan el Ran Tan Tan (ft. Héctor el Father)

2003 
 La Historia Live - Tú te estás calentando (ft. Héctor & Tito)
 La Historia Live - Ven suéltate (ft. Héctor & Tito)
 La Historia Live - Déjala (ft. Héctor & Tito)
 La Historia Live - Baila morena (ft. Héctor & Tito)
 La Historia Live - Amor de colegio (ft. Héctor & Tito)
 La Historia Live - Baila Morena Remix (ft. Héctor & Tito)
 Los Homerun-es - Gata gangster (ft. Daddy Yankee)
 MVP - Dale Don dale
 Blin Blin Vol. 1 - No me quitaron el sueño
 Gargolas Vol. 4: The Return - Luna
 La Saga - Desde que llegó (ft. DJ Eric)
 Mas Flow - Entre tú y yo
 Time 2 Kill II - Aunque te fuiste
 Time 2 Kill II - Loba (ft. Héctor el Father & Glory)

2004 
 Babilonia - Leona
 Sin Limites - Dile a Ella (ft. Magnate y Valentino)
 Los Anormales - Salvaje
 Clase Aparte - La Batidora (ft. Yaga y Mackie Ranks)
 La Trayectoria - Entre tú y yo
 La Trayectoria - Miralos
 La Trayectoria - Dale Don Dale
 La Trayectoria - Pasto y pelea
 La Trayectoria - Puedo con todos
 No Fear 4: Sin Miedo - Sueltate Conmigo (ft. DJ Dicky)
 Flow Callejero - Loba (ft. Héctor el Father)
 Reggaeton Superhits - Suelta
 The Score-Remixs - Te Tas Soltando
 Chosen Few: El Documental - Reggaeton Latino
 Rockton - Los Rabanes ft. Don Omar

2005 
 El Desafio - Intro El Desafio - (ft. Wisin & Yandel, Alexis, Tempo, Tego Calderón)
 El Desafio - Míralos 
 The Remixes - Dejala (ft. Dj Goldy)
 Reggaeton Hitmakers Vol. 1 - Dile
 Reggaeton Hitmakers Vol. 1 - Provocándome
 Reggaeton Hitmakers Vol. 1 - Dale Don Mas Duro
 El Que Habla con Las Manos - Ronca (ft. Héctor el Father & Zion)
 JamZ TV Hits Vol.3 - Guayaquil
 Supremacía - Te Fuistes
 Reggaeton Collection - Entre Tu y Yo
 Mas Flow Platinum Edition - Entre tu y Yo
 Sangre Nueva - Sacala (ft. Héctor el Father & Wisin & Yandel)
 Glou - La Traicionera (ft. Glory)
 Glou - La Popola (ft. Glory)
 Cuban Link - Scandalous (feat. Don Omar) | Chain Reaction
 Mas Flow 2 - Mayor que yo (ft. Baby Ranks, Zion y Alexis & Fido)
 La Moda - Vestido Blanco (ft. Yaga y Mackie Ranks)
 Eliel Greatest Beats - Circuito (ft. Mario VI)
 Eliel Greatest Beats - Pobre Diabla (Remix)
 South beach - Noche de adrenalina (ft. Pilar Montenegro)
 MVP2 Grand Slam - Dale Don
 Buddhas Family 2 - Descontrolate (ft. Tempo)
 Hold You Down (Remix) (ft. Jennifer Lopez)

2006 
 Los Rompediscotekas - Ahora son Mejor Que Yo
 Sangre Nueva: Special Edition - Sacala (ft. Wisin & Yandel & Héctor el Father)
 Luny Tunes: Lo Mejor - Entre tu y Yo
 Top of the Line - Tu Cintura (ft. Tito 'el Bambino')
 Decisión Unánime - Nunca Había Llorado Así (ft. Víctor Manuelle)
 Los Benjamins - Royal Rumble
 Los Benjamins - Beautiful
 The Underdog/El Subestimado - Chillin' (ft. Tego Calderón)
 Los Vaqueros: The Wild Wild Mixes - Nadie como tú 
 Los Vaqueros: The Wild Wild Mixes - La pared (ft. Wisin & Yandel & Gadiel)
 Tomando Control Live - Nadie como tú (ft. Wisin & Yandel
 Invasión - Mi Nena
 Belly Danza - Don Omar (ft. Beenie Man)

2007 
 Sentimiento − "Robarte Un Beso" (featuring Ivy Queen)
 Las Cosas Cambiaron (ft Wisin & Yandel)

2008 
 Quimica Sustancia (Feat. Arcángel)
 Las Cosas Cambiaron (Feat. Wisin & Yandel)
 Cuerpo Sensual (Feat. R.K.M. & Ken-Y)
 Subete (Official remix) (Feat. Alexis y Fido) 
 El Parque (Feat. Marcy Place)
 Mi Maldito Email (Feat. Hector Acosta "El Torito")
 El Cafe (Feat. Tito Swing) (Remix)
 Todo Lo Que Soy (Feat. Marcy Place)
 Dentro De Mi (Feat. Chino & Nacho)
 Fly Away (Feat. Inne Circle)
 Me Muero (Official remix) (Feat. Jadiel y Marcy Place)
 Run The Show (Official remix) (Feat. Kat DeLuna)
 Las Mujeres De Tu Vida (Feat. La Mosca)

2009 
 Solos (Feat. Tony Dize, Plan B) (Remix)
 Te Ire A Buscar (Feat. Baby Rasta, Farruko) (Remix)
 Te Ire A Buscar (Feat. Farruko, El Sujeto) (Mambo Remix)
 Psychos (Feat. Kendo Kaponi)
 Prueba De Sonido (Feat. Kendo Kaponi)
 Desafio(Feat. Daddy Yankee)
 Hasta Abajo (Official remix)(Feat. Daddy Yankee)
 Cazando Andamos (Feat. Zion y Arcángel)

2010 
 Miss Independiente (Feat. Daddy Yankee) 
 La Batidora 2 (Feat. Yaga y Mackie)
 Orphanization (Feat. Kendo Kaponi, Syko)
 El Duro (Feat. Kendo Kaponi)
 Hooka (Feat. Plan B)
 Angeles Y Demonios 2 (Feat. Kendo Kaponi, Syko)
 Viviendo Con El Enemigo (Feat. Kendo Kaponi)
 Huerfano De Amor (Feat. Syko)
 Ella Ella (Feat. Zion y Lennox)
 RX (Feat. Kendo Kaponi, Syko)
 Que Es La Que Hay (Feat. Kendo Kaponi, Syko)
 Incognita (Feat. Kendo Kaponi)
 Carta Al Cielo (Feat. Syko y Natti Natasha)
 Ella Se Contradice (Official remix) (Feat. Baby Rasta & Gringo, Syko y Kendo Kaponi)
 Stereo Love (Official remix) (Feat. Edward Maya, Vika Jigulina y Mia Martina)
 Te Ire A Buscar (Official remix) (Feat. Farruko y Marcy Place)
 Hold Yuh (Official remix) (Feat. Gyptian y Natti Natasha) 
 Tu No Tienes Ni Un Peso (Official remix) (Feat. Kendo Kaponi)
 Psychos (Official remix) (Feat. Kendo Kaponi, Syko, Pacho y Cirilo)
 Los Duros (Feat. Syko y Kendo Kaponi)
 El Duro (Official remix) (Feat. Kendo Kaponi, Daddy Yankee y Baby Rasta)
 Danza Kuduro (Feat. Lucenzo)
 Danza Kuduro (Official remix) (Feat. Lucenzo, Daddy Yankee y Arcángel)
 Bum Bum (Feat. Shaka Black, Rell y Tony Haze)
 Hasta Abajo (Official Remix) (Feat. Dynasty y Tempo)
 El doctorado (Official remix) (Feat.Tony Dize y Ken-Y)
 Que mujer tan chula (Official remix) (Feat. Vakero)

2011 
 A Donde Ira Tu Corazon (Feat. Natti Natasha)
 De Hombre A Hombre (Feat. Syko)
 A Lo Mejor Ya Es Tarde (Feat. Syko)
 Slow Motion (Feat. Syko, Trebol Clan)
 No Sigue Modas (Feat. Juan Magan)
 How we roll (Official remix)(Feat. Busta Rhymes, Reek Da Villian y J-doe)
 Te siento lejos (Feat. Cheka)
 Que es la que hay (Official remix)(Feat. Syko)
 Taboo (Official remix) (Feat. Victor Magan)

2012 
 F my life (Feat. Mims y Vinny Venditto)
 La llave de mi corazón (Feat. Yunel Cruz)
 Tus movimientos (Feat. Natti Natasha)
 Así es que es (Feat. Syko y Carmirelli)
 Dame una llamada (Feat. Syko)
 Intentalo (Official remix) (Feat. 3BallMTY)
 Danza Kuduro (Official remix) (Feat. Akon)
 Me prefieres a mi (Feat. Arcángel)
 Lovumba (Official remix) (Feat. Daddy Yankee)
 Taboo (Official remix) (Feat. Daddy Yankee)
 Te dijeron (Official remix) (Feat. Plan B Natti Natasha y Syko)
 Fotos y recuerdos (Feat. Selena)
 Fotos y recuerdos (Official remix) (Feat. Selena y Natti Natasha)

2013 
 Yo Soy de Aquí (Feat. Yandel, Arcángel & Daddy Yankee)
 Island (Feat. Akon)
 Enamorado de ti (Feat. Yandel)

2014 
 There is a place (Feat. Shaggy)
 Nada cambiara (Feat. Xavi The Destroyer)

2015 
 Pastillita (Feat. Tego Calderón)
 Finge que me amas (Feat. Tony Dize)
 Perdido en tus ojos (Feat. Natti Natasha)
 Callejero (Feat. Tego Calderón)
 En lo oscuro (Feat. Wisin & Yandel)
 Olvidar que somos amigos (Feat. Plan B)
 Dobla rodilla (Feat. Wisin)
 Tirate al medio (Feat. Daddy Yankee)
 * Tirate al medio (Official remix) (Feat. Daddy Yankee, Wisin y ...)
 Sandunga (Feat. Tego Calderón)
 I need your love (Official remix) (Feat. Shaggy, Mohombi, Faydee, Farruko y Costi)

2016 
 Sin Contrato (Remix), (Feat. Maluma, Wisin).
 La Fila, (Feat. Luny Tunes, Sharlene, Maluma).
 Mayor que yo 3 (Feat. Daddy Yankee, Wisin & Yandel)

2017 
 Dure Dure (Featuring. Jencarlos)
 Amame o Matame (Feat. Ivy Queen)
 Mr. Romantic (Featuring. Mike Stanley)

2018 
• "Coolant (Remix)" || Farruko & Don Omar || Gangalee

2019 
 Si Te Atreves, (Featuring. Juan Magán)
• Desierto || Amenazzy & Don Omar

2020 
• "PA' ROMPERLA" || Bad Bunny & Don Omar || LAS QUE NO IBAN A SALIR

Coming Soon 
 Flirting (Feat. Tony Dize)
 Mumba (Feat. Jennifer Lopez)
 Que rico es (Feat. Pitbull)
 Malo Malo (Feat Wisin & Yandel y Tempo)
 Un pirata (Official remix) (Feat. Jory)
 Let him go (official remix) (Feat. Dynasty)
 ??? (Feat. Nicky Jam y  Chencho)
 Andamos cazando (Feat. Arcángel, Farruko y Chencho)
 ??? (Feat. Ñengo Flow)
 Se Baila Pegao (Feat Nicky Jam)
 Caliente (Feat Jowell & Randy)  
 Cuestión De Tiempo (Feat Zion & Lennox) 

Don Omar
Omar, Don
Omar, Don